Lieve van Kessel (born 15 September 1977, Amsterdam) is a Dutch field hockey player.

Van Kessel won a silver medal at the 2004 Summer Olympics in Athens.

References

External links

1977 births
Living people
Dutch female field hockey players
Field hockey players at the 2004 Summer Olympics
Olympic field hockey players of the Netherlands
Olympic medalists in field hockey
Olympic silver medalists for the Netherlands
Field hockey players from Amsterdam
Medalists at the 2004 Summer Olympics
20th-century Dutch women
21st-century Dutch women